The Erebus Ice Tongue (more often called  "Erebus Glacier Tongue") is a mountain outlet glacier and the seaward extension of Erebus Glacier from Ross Island. It projects  into McMurdo Sound from the Ross Island coastline near Cape Evans, Antarctica. Explorers from Robert F. Scott's Discovery Expedition (1901–1904) named and charted the ice tongue.

The portion of the ice tongue extending beyond the shoreline or grounding line floats upon the water.

Ice tongues emerge when a glacier ice stream flows rapidly (relative to surrounding ice) into the sea or a lake, usually in a protected area. For instance, Capes Evans and Royds extending from Ross Island protect the Erebus Ice Tongue from the open waters of the Ross Sea. Hut Point Peninsula to the south helps deflect icebergs propelled by prevailing southerly winds.

The long, narrow Erebus ice stream drains from the western slope of Mount Erebus, an active volcano rising  in elevation. The mountain constantly replenishes the glacial ice stream, as annual snow fall exceeds annual snow melt. The Erebus Ice Tongue is a dynamic structure subject to a host of internal and external stresses which affect its shape, size, and durability.

Ice tongue harbors

The frozen sea ice of Erebus Bay surrounding the Erebus Ice Tongue typically breaks out during the summer. This exposes the ice tongue to pounding waves from McMurdo Sound.

Moreover, such wave action also impacts the ice caves accessed along the leading edges of the ice tongue. The ice caves include inter-locked crevasses covered by snow bridges. The ice caves are a popular attraction for residents from nearby the McMurdo Station and Scott Base research stations. Visitors report observing stalactite-like icicles on the cave ceilings, as well as intricate ice crystals. Sunlight filtering through ice into the caves bathes the interiors with diffuse blue light.

Contemporary cave explorers who squeezed through a narrow tunnel several hundred feet long to emerge into a large cavern describe their Erebus Ice Tongue experience as:
Sitting quietly we absorb the natural beauty. Suddenly, we hear the low grinding noise of the glacier moving and the three of us instinctively look at the narrow opening. Without saying a word we realize that it wouldn’t take much for the entrance to collapse and become sealed and trap us here. One by one we slowly exit. Steve later finds a cave that will safely hold all 10 of us. With childlike enthusiasm we explore the glacial cathedral with walls of deep blue ice. Breaking off pieces of ice, 10 or 20,000 years old, we melt it in our mouths and savour the taste of pure, uncontaminated water.

Scientists funded by a National Science Foundation grant have retrieved rare underwater views of the Erebus Ice Tongue caves by mounting cameras on Weddell seals. Images revealed rocks and dead fish frozen into the ice. Video also depicted other Weddell seals that appeared to use the underwater caves as hiding places from predators such as the orca (or killer whale) and the leopard seal.

Weddell seals are commonly sighted by visitors to the Erebus Ice Tongue. Each year 300 to 400 Weddell seal pups are born to a colony of seals that live in adjoining Erebus Bay. The seals have been distinctively marked and re-sighted since 1969. The nearly 40-year study represents one of the longest field investigations of its type, according to a Montana State University report.

Emperor and Adelie penguins are also found in the vicinity of the Erebus Ice Tongue. Adelie are particularly noted for their rookeries on Erebus Bay's rocky north shore at nearby Cape Royds. Penguins, like the Weddell seal, are preyed upon by orcas and leopard seals. The presence of penguins also attracts the predatory skua seabird. 

Scarce mention of the ice tongue's surface, which is more than a mile wide, is made in popular literature. A notable exception is in Ernest Shackleton's book, South! The leader of a December 1916 search party seeking fellow explorers missing in vicinity of the ice tongue made the following report to Shackleton:
On January 2 thick weather caused party to lay up. On 3rd, glacier was further examined, and several slopes formed by snow led to top of glacier, but crevasses between slope and the tongue prevented crossing. The party then proceeded round the Tongue to Tent Island, which was also searched, a complete tour of the island being made.

Ice tongue dynamics

The dynamics within floating ice streams such as the Erebus Ice Tongue are complex. For instance, typically ice streams such as the Erebus Ice Tongue, which ranges from 50 to 300 meters thick, contain smaller streams of ice. Each ice flow produces its own set of stress fields. Thus, throughout the ice tongue, different flow rates and tensions are present.

Stress and friction increase along the flanks of ice streams such as the Erebus Ice Tongue. Stress appears as crevasses as the ice flow rate is slowed. Friction created by the Earth's topography at the bottom of the glacier also slows the ice stream. However, just the opposite occurs with basal sliding. Such sliding features the glacier jerking forward due to lubrication from bottom melt-water.

Ice streams such as the Erebus Ice Tongue wax and wane like the moon. Indeed, British researchers in 2006 discovered a correlation between lunar tides (caused by gravitational pull) and variances in flow speed of the Rutland Ice Stream in Antarctica. Previously a team of U.S. NASA, Penn State, and University of Newcastle; Newcastle upon Tyne, England; made similar observations of Whillan's Ice Stream in Antarctica.

However, more established research unrelated to lunar forces is available regarding cyclical glacier growth and decay. Such research reveals that glacier growth can produce slow-motion surges in the glacier's movement. Such surges may occur over a period of months or years. Then the movement stops. Scientists have measured Erebus Ice Tongue's length as growing about 160 meters yearly.

The Erebus Ice Tongue flow pushes the glacier into Erebus Bay where it butts against seasonal ice pack. This massive but gradual collision of ice against ice creates pressure ridges in the glacier. Portions of the ice tongue become unstable, rupture, and calve icebergs. Such instability in part comes from the flexing and tension the ice beam undergoes from being cantilevered over the sea. Moreover, the river of ice carries with it weaknesses introduced by earlier fractures experienced during its journey down the slopes of Mount Erebus.

Effects on the ocean
The floating glacier has a major effect on the local ocean.  It's melting has been thought to create Double diffusive convection effects. A 2010 expedition funded by the Marsden Fund supported deployment of Timothy Haskell's sea ice camp right next to the tongue.  Observations from the camp showed how the tide flowed beneath and along the tongue and was affected by submarine topography.

Iceberg calving
The forces of wave action from McMurdo Sound, tides, and internal stresses exploit the ice tongue's weaknesses. Subsequently small icebergs and bergy bits typically calf from the Erebus Ice Tongue but only when the sea ice has broken up. Subsequently, iceberg calving is seasonal and periodic, as open water is needed to release the bergs into Erebus Bay.

Members of Robert F. Scott's Terra Nova Expedition first observed the glacier tongue calving in March 1911 when a 4 km section broke off during a gale. A similar event in March 1990 produced a 100-million ton iceberg, 3.5 km long, from the glacier tongue. In addition, observers note that the glacier tongue experienced a major calving event in the early 1940s. Such calving along the glacier snout naturally leads to shortening, while icebergs released from the ice tongue sides contribute to the glacier's narrowing. The Erebus Ice Tongue produces flat-topped or tabular icebergs. It calved most recently in 2013, around a decade earlier than expected.

Gallery

See also
Glacier
McMurdo Sound
Mount Erebus
Ross Island
 List of glaciers in the Antarctic
 Iceberg

References

External links
All About Glaciers
Glaciers of the World
The Ice Cave Tour
National Snow and Ice Data Center
NOAA Photo Library

Ice tongues of Antarctica
Landforms of Ross Island